The Xerox Character Code Standard (XCCS) is a historical 16-bit character encoding that was created by Xerox in 1980 for the exchange of information between elements of the Xerox Network Systems Architecture. It encodes the characters required for languages using the Latin, Arabic, Hebrew, Greek and Cyrillic scripts, the Chinese, Japanese and Korean writing systems, and technical symbols.

It can be viewed as an early precursor of, and inspiration for, the Unicode Standard.

The International Character Set (ICS) is compatible with XCCS.

The XCCS 2.0 (1990) revision covers Latin, Arabic, Hebrew, Gothic, Armenian, Runic, Georgian, Greek, Cyrillic, Hiragana, Katakana, Bopomofo scripts, technical, and mathematical symbols.

Code charts

Character sets overview

Character set 0x00

Character set 0x21

Character set 0x22

Character set 0x23

Character set 0x24

Character set 0x25

Character set 0x26

Character set 0x27

Character set 0x28

Character set 0x30

Character set 0x31

Character set 0xE0

Character set 0xE1

Character set 0xE2

Character set 0xE3

Character set 0xEE

Character set 0xEF

Character set 0xF0

Character set 0xF1

See also 
 Interscript
 Lotus Multi-Byte Character Set (LMBCS)

References

Further reading 

 (100 pp.)

Character encoding
Character sets
Computer-related introductions in 1980
Character Code Standard